Qurayyat Falhah is a town in the Amman Governorate of north-western Jordan.

References

Populated places in Amman Governorate